The Teatro Adriano (i.e. "Adriano Theater"), also known as  Politeama Adriano and Cinema Adriano, is a cinema and former theatre located in Piazza Cavour, Rome, Italy.

It was built by Pio Gallas and Romeo Bisini on a project by architect Luigi Rolland (the father of Luigi Moretti) and inaugurated on 1 June 1898 with a representation of the Amilcare Ponchielli's opera La Gioconda conducted by Edoardo Mascheroni.

The Beatles played four shows here in June 1965 during their European Tour.

References

External links 

Theatres in Rome
Cinemas in Italy
Theatres completed in 1898
19th-century architecture in Italy